130th is a proposed rapid transit station for the Red Line as part of the Red Line Extension. The station is planned to open in 2029 if the CTA can get the funding for the $3.6 billion project. The station would be constructed in Chicago's Riverdale neighborhood.

References

External links
Red Ahead
Red Line Extension

CTA Red Line stations
Chicago "L" terminal stations
Railway stations scheduled to open in 2029
Proposed Chicago "L" stations